The  was a class of ocean liners of Japan, serving during the 1930s, and into World War II.

Background
 In 1925, the Swedish American Line constructed the passenger liner MS Kungsholm. The  was concerned about the MS Kungsholms construction.
 In 1927-28, the NYK Line placed an order for eight ocean liners to reinforce the Japan–Seattle route (3 × Hikawa Maru class), Japan–San Francisco route (3 × Asama Maru class), and Japan–London route (2 × Terukuni Maru class).

Service

Terukuni Maru
 9 January 1929: Laid Down at Mitsubishi Heavy Industries, Nagasaki Shipyard.
 19 December 1929: Launched.
 31 May 1930: Completed.
 30 June 1930: Maiden voyage for Yokohama–London.
 (after): She sailed 24 times until September 1939.
 24 September 1939: The 25th sailing to London.
 19 November 1939: Arrived off South Downs. She anchored here till minesweeping of the River Thames by Royal Navy was over.
 08:30, 21 November 1939: Weigh anchor.
 13:35: Sunk.

The wreck lay on its side, partly submerged and visible to wartime shipping in the Thames Estuary area.

Yasukuni Maru
 22 April 1929: Laid Down at Mitsubishi Heavy Industries, Nagasaki Shipyard.
 15 February 1930: Launched.
 31 August 1930: Completed.
 22 September 1930: Maiden voyage for Yokohama–London.
 (after): She sailed many times until October 1939.
 25 October 1939: Enlisted by the Navy. Classification to the Auxiliary transport.
 11 December 1939: Discharged.
 29 October 1940: Enlisted by the Navy. 30 October, armament fitted in Kure Naval Arsenal.
 16 December 1940: Classification to the Auxiliary submarine tender.
 11 January 1941: Fitting out was completed, and assigned to the 1st Submarine Division, 6th Fleet.
 20 December 1941: Assigned to the 3rd Submarine Division, 6th Fleet.
 1 February 1942: Bombed by Task Force 8 at Kwajalein.
 1 March 1942: Arrived at Kure Naval Arsenal and repairs were started.
 23 April 1942: Repairs were completed. Sailed to Truk and Kwajalein.
 15 September 1943: Assigned to the 6th Fleet.
 31 January 1944: Sunk by USS Trigger at northwest off Truk .
 10 March 1944: Removed from naval ship lists, and discharged.

Photos

See also
 Hikawa Maru-class ocean liner
 Foreign commerce and shipping of Empire of Japan

References

Bibliography
 Tashirō Iwashige, The visual guide of Japanese wartime merchant marine,  (Japan), May 2009
 Ships of the World special issue, The Golden Age of Japanese Passenger Liners, (Japan), May 2004
 Voyage of a Century "Photo Collection of NYK Ships", (Japan), October 1985
 The Maru Special, Japanese Naval Vessels No.29, "Japanese submarine tenders w/ auxiliary submarine tenders",  (Japan), July 1979

Ocean liner classes
Empire of Japan
World War II naval ships of Japan
Submarine tenders of the Imperial Japanese Navy
Submarine tenders
Ships of the NYK Line
World War II merchant ships of Japan
1929 ships
1930 ships